The 1985 Tokyo Indoor also known as "Seiko Super Tennis" was a men's tennis tournament played on indoor carpet courts at the Yoyogi National Gymnasium in Tokyo, Japan that was part of the 1985 Nabisco Grand Prix. It was the eighth edition of the tournament and was held from 15 October through 19 October 1985. It was a major tournament of the Grand Prix tennis circuit and  matches were the best of three sets. First-seeded Ivan Lendl won the singles title.

Finals

Singles

 Ivan Lendl defeated  Mats Wilander 6–0, 6–4
 It was Lendl's 9th singles title of the year and the 51st of his career.

Doubles

 Ken Flach /  Robert Seguso defeated  Scott Davis /  David Pate 4–6, 6–3, 7–6

References

External links
 ITF tournament edition details

Tokyo Indoor
Tokyo Indoor
Tokyo Indoor